Fotis Polymeris (20 February 1920, Patras – 28 May 2013, Athens), born as Fotios Palymeris (Φώτιος Παλημέρης), was a Greek guitarist, singer and composer.

He is considered amongst the most successful representatives of the "early popular" Greek songs with a personal  trobadour-style. He wrote lyrics and music for over 100 songs and collaborated with the most significant composers of this style. Also, Polymeris' music is heard in several Greek films.

Later he co-worked also with people from rebetiko-style music, such as Vassilis Tsitsanis.

References

1920 births
2013 deaths
Musicians from Patras
Greek guitarists
Greek classical guitarists
Greek singer-songwriters